3rd Vitranc Cup was an alpine skiing competition, held between 29 February–1 March 1964 in Kranjska Gora, SR Slovenia, Yugoslavia, hosting two FIS 1A international events.

Official results

Giant slalom 
On 29 February, giant slalom was held on 1,850 metres long course with vertical drop at 515 metres.

Slalom 
On 1 March, slalom was held on »Bedanc« (1st) and »Vitranc« (2nd) courses above Bukovnik meadow with vertical drop at 160 metres.

References

External links
 

International sports competitions hosted by Yugoslavia
1964 in Yugoslav sport
International sports competitions hosted by Slovenia
Alpine skiing competitions
Alpine skiing in Slovenia
1964 in Slovenia

sl:3. Pokal Vitranc (1964)